Dato' Haji Che Abdullah bin Mat Nawi is a Malaysian politician who has served in the government as Chairman of Farmers' Organization Authority (FOA) since September 2021. He served as the Member of Parliament (MP) for Tumpat from May 2018 to November 2022 and the Deputy Minister of Agriculture and Food Industries II in the Perikatan Nasional (PN) administration under former Prime Minister Muhyiddin Yassin and former Minister Ronald Kiandee from March 2020 to August 2021. He served as Member of the Kelantan State Legislative Assembly (MLA) for Wakaf Bharu from March 2008 to May 2018. He is a member of the United Malays National Organization (UMNO), a component party of the BN coalition.

Politics 

Che Abdullah contested Wakaf Bharu assembly state in Wakaf Bharu in 2008 and re-elected in 2013 general election. He contested Tumpat parliamentary seat in 2018 and won that seat.

At the party level, he is the Secretary of the Kelantan PAS Liaison Agency.  He has been the Chairman of the Agriculture, Agro-based Industry, Biotechnology and Green Technology of the State Government of Kelantan.

On 9 March 2020, Muhyiddin Yassin announced that Che Abdullah will be appointed as Deputy Minister of Agriculture and Food Industries and to be served along with Ahmad Hamzah from Barisan Nasional.

Election results

Honours
  :
  Knight Commander of the Order of the Life of the Crown of Kelantan (DJMK) – Dato' (2012)

References

Living people
People from Kelantan
Malaysian people of Malay descent
Members of the Dewan Rakyat
21st-century Malaysian politicians
Malaysian Islamic Party politicians
1960 births